The Wangi Falls is a segmented waterfall on the Wangi Creek located within the Litchfield National Park in the Northern Territory of Australia.

Location and features

The plunge pool at the base of the falls is a popular swimming spot, however is often closed following significant rainfall due to sightings of crocodiles in the area.

See also

 List of waterfalls of the Northern Territory

References

External links

 
 

Waterfalls of the Northern Territory
Segmented waterfalls
Litchfield National Park